The 1970–71 St. Louis Blues season was the St. Louis Blues' fourth season in the National Hockey League (NHL).

The Blues began the 1970–71 season with high hopes after making a trip to the Stanley Cup Finals in the 1969–70 season. They purchased Christian Bordeleau from the Montreal Canadiens, who led the team in scoring and finished in the top five in game winning goals that season. They also sold Hall-of-Famer Jacques Plante to the Toronto Maple Leafs.

During this season the Blues saw the most ties in their history (19), as well as most home ties (9), and the fewest home losses (7).

Regular season

Divisional standings

Schedule and results

Postseason
 
Minnesota wins series 4–2.

Statistics

Skater statistics
Note: GP = Games played; G = Goals; A = Assists; Pts = Points; PIM = Penalties in minutes

Playoffs

(W2) St. Louis Blues vs. (W4) Minnesota North Stars

Goalie statistics
Note: GP = Games played; TOI = Time on ice (minutes); W = Wins; L = Losses; T = Ties; GA = Goals against; SO = Shutouts; Sv% = Save percentage; GAA = Goals against average

Draft picks
St. Louis's draft picks at the 1970 NHL Amateur Draft held at the Queen Elizabeth Hotel in Montreal, Quebec.

References

St. Louis Blues seasons
St. Louis
St. Louis
St. Louis Blues
St. Louis Blues